Melipona quinquefasciata, commonly known as the mandaçaia-da-terra or mandaçaia-do-chão (Brazilian Portuguese: "ground mandaçaia" bee) in Brazil, is a species of eusocial stingless bee in the family Apidae and tribe Meliponini.

References 

quinquefasciata
Hymenoptera of South America
Hymenoptera of Brazil
Insects described in 1836